Elachista kebneella is a moth of the family Elachistidae. It is found in Sweden, Finland and northern Russia.

The wingspan is 8–9 mm. Adults have been recorded in June and July.

References

kebneella
Moths described in 1977
Moths of Europe